This list of lichenicolous fungi of Iceland is based on a compiled checklist from 2009 with the taxonomy of the fungi revised in 2022 using the Global Biodiversity Information Facility online database.

 Abrothallus parmeliarum  
 Arthonia epiphyscia 
 Arthonia fuscopurpurea 
 Arthonia gelidae 
 Arthonia intexta 
 Arthonia stereocaulina 
 Arthonia varians 
 Arthophacopsis parmeliarum 
 Bachmanniomyces punctum  (listed as Phaeopyxis punctum )
 Bachmanniomyces uncialicola 
 Buellia adjuncta 
 Carbonea supersparsa 
 Carbonea vitellinaria 
 Cecidonia umbonella 
 Cecidonia xenophana 
 Cercidospora epipolytropa 
 Cercidospora macrospora 
 Cercidospora punctillata 
 Cercidospora stereocaulorum 
 Cercidospora thamnoliicola 
 Cercidospora trypetheliza 
 Cercidospora verrucosaria 
 Clypeococcum placopsiphilum 
 Collemopsidium cephalodiorum  (listed as Cercidispora cephalodiorum )
 Corticifraga peltigerae 
 Didymellopsis pulposi 
 Endococcus fusiger 
 Endococcus propinquus 
 Endococcus rugulosus  (also listed as Endococcus perpusillus  which is a synonym of E. rugulosus)
 Epibryon conductrix  
 Geltingia associata 
 Heterocephalacria bachmannii  (listed as Syzygospora bachmannii )
 Homostegia piggotii 
 Intralichen christiansenii 
 Lasiosphaeriopsis christiansenii 
 Lasiosphaeriopsis stereocaulicola 
 Lichenochora lepidiotae  (listed as Sphaerulina lepidiotae )
 Lichenodiplis lecanorae 
 Lichenopeltella cetrariicola 
 Lichenopeltella cladoniarum 
 Lichenosticta alcicornaria 
 Merismatium nigritellum 
 Muellerella erratica  (listed as Muellerella pygmaea var. athallina )
 Muellerella pygmaea 
 Muellerella pygmaea var. pygmaea
 Muellerella ventosicola  (listed as Muellerella pygmaea var. ventosicola )
 Niesslia peltigericola  (listed as Raciborskiomyces peltigericola )
 Opegrapha pulvinata  (synonym of O. pulvinata )
 Opegrapha stereocaulicola 
 Phaeocalicium populneum 
 Polycoccum amygdalariae 
 Polycoccum deformans 
 Polycoccum pulvinatum 
 Polycoccum trypethelioides 
 Polycoccum vermicularium 
 Pronectria erythrinella 
 Punctelia oxyspora  (listed as  Phacopsis oxyspora )
 Pronectria robergei 
 Pronectria solorinae 
 Protothelenella croceae 
 Pseudopyrenidium tartaricola  (listed as Weddellomyces tartaricola )
 Pyrenidium actinellum 
 Rhagadostoma brevisporum 
 Rhagadostoma lichenicola 
 Roselliniopsis gelidaria  (listed as Polycoccum gelidarium )
 Sclerococcum amygdalariae  (listed as Dactylospora amygdalariae )
 Sclerococcum athallinum  (listed as Dactylospora athallina )
 Sclerococcum attendendum  (listed as Dactylospora attendenda )
 Sclerococcum deminuta  (listed as Dactylospora deminuta )
 Sclerococcum frigidum  (listed as Dactylospora frigida )
 Sclerococcum gelidarium 
 Sclreococcum glaucomarioides  (listed as Dactylospora glaucomarioides )
 Sclerococcum parasiticum  (listed as Dactylospora parasitica )
 Sclerococcum parellarium  (listed as Dactylospora parellaria )
 Sclerococcum purpurescens  (listed as Dactylospora purpurascens )
 Sclerococcum sphaerale 
 Scutula krempelhuberi 
 Scutula stereocaulorum 
 Scutula tuberculosa 
 Sphaerellothecium araneosum 
 Sphaeropezia santessonii  (listed as Odontotrema santessonii )
 Stigmidium allogenum  (listed as Stigmidium psorae )
 Stigmidium marinum 
 Stigmidium peltideae 
 Stigmidium stygnospilum 
 Tetramelas pulverulentus 
 Tetramelas phaeophysciae 
 Thamnogalla crombiei 
 Xenonectriella ornamentata  (listed as Pronectria ornamentata )
 Zwackhiomacromyces hyalosporus  (listed as Pyrenidium hyalosporum )
 Zwackhiomyces dispersus  (listed as Stigmidium conspurcans )

References

Lichenology

lichenicolous fungi
Lists of fungi